The discography of American singer Suzanne Vega consists of nine studio albums, four acoustic albums, two greatest hits albums, one box set, seven live albums, one extended play, and 23 singles.

Albums

Studio albums

Acoustic albums

Compilation albums

Live albums

Extended plays

Singles

As main artist

Promotional singles

As featured artist

Other contributions 
The Smithereens: Especially for You (1986) – "In a Lonely Place"
Philip Glass: Songs from Liquid Days (1986) – "Lightning" and "Freezing"
Stay Awake: Various Interpretations of Music from Vintage Disney Films (1988) – "Stay Awake"
One World One Voice (1990) – "One World, One Voice"
Deadicated: A Tribute to the Grateful Dead (1991) – "Cassidy" and "China Doll"
DNA: Taste This (1992) – "Tom's Diner" (DNA Remix) and "Salt Water"
Hector Zazou: Songs from the Cold Seas (1994) – "The Long Voyage" (with John Cale)
Grammy's Greatest Moments Volume III (1994) – "Luka" (live version)
Tower of Song (1995) – "Story of Isaac"
Dead Man Walking soundtrack (1995) – "Woman on the Tier (I'll See You Through)"
Time and Love: The Music of Laura Nyro (1997) – "Buy and Sell"
"Perfect Day" (multi-artist cover version recorded for the BBC, 1997)
Joe Jackson: Heaven & Hell (1997) – "Angel (Lust)"
Mitchell Froom: Dopamine (1998) – "Dopamine"
Celebrate the Season (1998) – "Coventry Carol"
Bleecker Street: Greenwich Village in the 60's (1999) – "So Long, Marianne" (with John Cale)
Dan Zanes: Rocket Ship Beach (2000) – "Erie Canal"
Hear Music Volume 7: Waking (2002) – "Widow's Walk"
107.1 KGSR Radio Austin – Broadcasts Vol.10 (2002) – "Widow's Walk"
WYEP Live and Direct: Volume 4 – On Air Performances (2002) – "(I'll Never Be) Your Maggie May"
Vigil (2004) – "It Hit Home"
WFUV: City Folk Live VII (2004) – "Penitent"
The Acoustic Album (2006, Virgin) – "Marlene On the Wall"
Dar Williams: Promised Land (2008) – "Go to the Woods"
Danger Mouse and Sparklehorse Present: Dark Night of the Soul (2009) – "The Man Who Played God"
Pioneers for a Cure: Songs to Fight Cancer (2011) – "Streets of Laredo"
Jonathan Coulton: Artificial Heart (2011) – "Now I Am an Arsonist"
Čechomor: Místečko (2011) - "Rain Is Falling"

Music videos 
 "Marlene on the Wall" / Film Director – Leslie Liebman / 1985
 "Left of Center" / Film Directors – Ken Ross, Richard Levine / 1986
 "Gypsy" / Film Director – Dominic Brigstocke / 1986
 "Luka" / Film Directors – Candace Reckinger, Michael Patterson / 1987
 "Tom's Diner" / Film Director – Gareth Roberts / 1987
 "Solitude Standing" / Film Director – Jonathan Demme / 1987
 "Book of Dreams" / Film Directors – Andrew Doucette, Geof Kern / 1990
 "Tired of Sleeping" / Film Director – Tarsem Singh / 1990
 "Men in a War" / Film Director – Paula Greif / 1990
 "Tom's Diner" /  DNA featuring Suzanne Vega / 1990
 "In Liverpool" / Film Director – Howard Greenhalgh / 1992
 "99.9F°" / Film Director – Nico Beyer / 1992
 "Blood Makes Noise" / Film Director – Nico Beyer / 1992
 "When Heroes Go Down" / Film Director – Peter Care / 1993
 "Caramel" / Film Director – Charles Whittenmeier / 1996
 "Caramel" (Alternate Version) Edited By [Re-edit] – Brett Truett, Mike Ragogna / 1996
 "No Cheap Thrill" / Film Director – David Cameron / 1996
 "Book & a Cover" / Film Director – Geoff Moore / 1998
 "Last Year's Troubles" / Film Director – Tim Vega / 2001
 "Frank & Ava" / Film Director – / 2007
 "Fool's Complaint" / lyrics video / 2014
 "We of Me" /  Film Director – Chuck Moore / 2016

References 

Discographies of American artists